Social Family Records is an independent record label in Australia.
All Social Family Records releases are distributed in Australia by EMI Music Australia/Universal Music Australia and internationally by The Orchard.Social Family Records is fully accredited by ARIA and report sales daily for chart inclusion.

The first album released by Social Family Records was This Is not the End by Baby Animals in May 2013. The album peaked at 19 on the ARIA Chart.

Current artists
Caroline Jones
Cormac Neeson
Glenn Shorrock
Shannon Noll
Gretta Ziller
 Andrew Swift
 Hayley Jensen
Jetty Road
Kirsty Lee Acres
 Neilly Rich
 Emily Hatton

References

External links
 

Record label distributors
Australian independent record labels
Record labels established in 2012
2012 establishments in Australia